Baula is a mountain situated in the west of Iceland near Route 1, Bifröst University, and the craters of Grábrók. The mountain's reddish or orange hue is caused by its rhyolite rock composition.

Geologically, the mountain is a laccolith, a type of igneous intrusion. It was formed 3.4 million years ago.

Baula is characterized by its almost perfect cone. Nearby is Baula's “little sister,” a mountain called Litla-Baula, where rare columns of rhyolite are found. Together, Baula and Litla-Baula have often been described as Iceland's most beautiful pair of mountains.

See also
Volcanism of Iceland

References 

 Hróarsson, Björn (1994) Á ferð um landið, Borgarfjörður og Mýrar, Mál og menning  (in Icelandic)

Volcanism of Iceland
Mountains of Iceland
Pliocene magmatism
Laccoliths
Borgarbyggð